The 1982 South African Open was a men's tennis tournament played on outdoor hard courts in Johannesburg, South Africa that was part of the 1982 Volvo Grand Prix. It was the 79th edition of the tournament and was held from 23 November through 28 November 1982. Vitas Gerulaitis won his second consecutive singles title at the event.

Finals

Singles
 Vitas Gerulaitis defeated  Guillermo Vilas 7–6, 6–2, 4–6, 7–6
 It was Gerulaitis' 5th singles title of the year and the 24th of his career.

Doubles
 Brian Gottfried /  Frew McMillan defeated  Schlomo Glickstein /  Andrew Pattison 6–2, 6–2

References

External links
 ITF tournament edition details

South African Open
South African Open (tennis)
Open
Sports competitions in Johannesburg
1980s in Johannesburg
November 1982 sports events in Africa